Crossocheilus pseudobagroides is a species of ray-finned fish in the genus Crossocheilus. It is native to Malaysia and Indonesia.

References

Crossocheilus
Fish described in 1904